Swailes is a surname. Notable people with the surname include:

Chris Swailes (born 1970), English football player
Danny Swailes (born 1979), English football player
Donovan Swailes (1892–1984), Canadian politician and musician
Robert Swailes (1896–1968), Canadian politician